Guglielmo Burelli (born June 30, 1936 in Vicenza) is a retired Italian professional football player.

External links
 Career summary by playerhistory.com

1936 births
Living people
Italian footballers
Italian expatriate footballers
Expatriate soccer players in Canada
Serie A players
Serie B players
L.R. Vicenza players
Juventus F.C. players
Bologna F.C. 1909 players
Udinese Calcio players
S.S.D. Varese Calcio players
National Professional Soccer League (1967) players
Toronto Falcons (1967–68) players
Association football defenders
Sportspeople from Vicenza
Footballers from Veneto